Aristarchus is a lunar impact crater that lies in the northwest part of the Moon's near side. It is considered the brightest of the large formations on the lunar surface, with an albedo nearly double that of most lunar features. The feature is bright enough to be visible to the naked eye, and displays unusually bright features when viewed through a large telescope. It is also readily identified when most of the lunar surface is illuminated by earthshine. The crater is deeper than the Grand Canyon.

The crater is named after the Greek astronomer Aristarchus of Samos. It is located at the southeastern edge of the Aristarchus plateau, an elevated area that contains a number of volcanic features, such as sinuous rilles. This area is also noted for the large number of reported transient lunar phenomena, as well as recent emissions of radon gas as measured by the Lunar Prospector spacecraft.

Selenography 
 
Aristarchus is located on the Aristarchus plateau, an elevated rocky rise in the midst of the Oceanus Procellarum, a large expanse of lunar mare. This is a tilted crustal block, about 200 km across, that rises to a maximum elevation of 2 km above the mare in the southeastern section. Aristarchus is just to the east of the crater Herodotus and the Vallis Schröteri, and south of a system of narrow sinuous rilles named Rimae Aristarchus.

Aristarchus is bright because it is a relatively young formation, approximately 450 million years old, and the solar wind has not yet had time to darken the excavated material by the process of space weathering. The impact occurred following the creation of the ray crater Copernicus, but before the appearance of Tycho.  Due to its prominent rays, Aristarchus is mapped as part of the Copernican System.

The brightest feature of this crater is the steep central peak. Sections of the interior floor appear relatively level, but Lunar Orbiter photographs reveal the surface is covered in many small hills, streaky gouges, and some minor fractures. The crater has a terraced outer wall, roughly or polygonal in shape, and covered in a bright blanket of ejecta.  These spread out into bright rays to the south and south-east, suggesting that Aristarchus was most likely formed by an oblique impact from the northeast, and their composition includes material from both the Aristarchus plateau and the lunar mare.

In November 2011, the Lunar Reconnaissance Orbiter passed over the crater, which spans almost 25 miles (40 kilometers) and sinks more than 2 miles (3.5 kilometers) deep. "The Aristarchus plateau is one of the most geologically diverse places on the moon: a mysterious raised flat plateau, a giant rille carved by enormous outpourings of lava, fields of explosive volcanic ash, and all surrounded by massive flood basalts," said Mark Robinson, principal investigator of the Lunar Reconnaissance Orbiter Camera at Arizona State University. NASA released photos of the crater on December 25, 2011.

Remote sensing
In 1911, Professor Robert W. Wood used ultraviolet photography to take images of the crater area. He discovered the plateau had an anomalous appearance in the ultraviolet, and an area to the north appeared to give indications of a sulfur deposit. This colorful area is sometimes referred to as "Wood's Spot", an alternative name for the Aristarchus plateau.

Spectra taken of this crater during the Clementine mission were used to perform mineral mapping. The data indicated that the central peak is a type of rock called anorthosite, which is a slow-cooling form of igneous rock composed of plagioclase feldspar. By contrast the outer wall is troctolite, a rock composed of equal parts plagioclase and olivine.

The Aristarchus region was part of a Hubble Space Telescope study in 2005 that was investigating the presence of oxygen-rich glassy soils in the form of the mineral ilmenite. Baseline measurements were made of the Apollo 15 and Apollo 17 landing sites, where the chemistry is known, and these were compared to Aristarchus. The Hubble Advanced Camera for Surveys was used to photograph the crater in visual and ultraviolet light. The crater was determined to have especially rich concentrations of ilmenite, a titanium oxide mineral that could potentially be used in the future by a lunar settlement for extracting oxygen.

Transient lunar phenomena
The region of the Aristarchus plateau has been the site of many reported transient lunar phenomena, with a total of 122 such reports by 2007; the highest recorded for any lunar feature. Such events include temporary obscurations and colorations of the surface, and catalogues of these show that more than one-third of the most reliable spottings come from this locale. In 1971 when Apollo 15 passed 110 kilometers above the Aristarchus plateau, a significant rise in alpha particles was detected. These particles are believed to be caused by the decay of radon-222, a radioactive gas with a half-life of only 3.8 days. The Lunar Prospector mission later confirmed radon-222 emissions from this crater. These observations could be explained by either the slow and visually imperceptible diffusion of gas to the surface, or by discrete explosive events.

One of the oldest reports of transient lunar phenomena in Aristarchus is an observation made by Heinrich Wilhelm Matthias Olbers on 5 February 1821. Contemporary Henry Kater publicly believed that this and other events were due to volcanic activity on the Moon, a belief not so confidently shared by Olbers, who believed it explainable in a manner "more consistent with what we know of the physical construction of the moon."

Names
Aristarchus is named after the Greek astronomer Aristarchus of Samos. Like many of the craters on the Moon's near side, it was given its name by Giovanni Riccioli, whose 1651 nomenclature system became standardized in 1935. Earlier lunar cartographers had given the feature different names. Michael van Langren's 1645 map calls it "Balthasaris Hispa. Pri." after Balthazar Charles, then the heir apparent to the kingdoms of Spain. And Johannes Hevelius called it "Mons Porphyrites" after the mountains near Olbia, Egypt.  A particular region of very low ultraviolet albedo is called Wood's Spot after its discoverer, Robert W. Wood.

Satellite craters 

Surrounding Aristarchus are several smaller craters, many of which are probably secondary craters. Secondary craters form when large blocks ejected from the primary crater reimpact the surface at high velocities. By convention these features are identified on lunar maps by placing a letter on the side of the crater midpoint that is closest to the primary crater.

The following craters have been renamed by the IAU.

 Aristarchus A — See Väisälä.
 Aristarchus C — See Toscanelli.

See also

 Apollo 18
 Human Lunar Return study

References

Sources

External links

 Lunar Orbiter 5 acquired high-resolution images of Aristarchus: Frame 194, Frame 196, Frame 198, and Frame 200

Impact craters on the Moon